World distribution of wealth is the distribution of how wealth is distributed around the world. The guideline for categorizing the data is to organize it based on the continent on which the people with wealth reside.

Data organization
Sometimes the data is organized by household wealth.  It is useful to do it this way because sometimes the holders of wealth take care of other people who have no wealth, such as children or other family members.

World distribution of wealth (2016) 
Data for the following tables is obtained from The UN-WIDER World Distribution of Household Wealth Report.

Northern America

Central and South America

Europe

Africa

Middle East

Asia

Other

Net worth per capita  (2016) 
Data for the following tables is obtained from The UN-WIDER World Distribution of Household Wealth Report.

References

See also
 Distribution of wealth
 List of countries by distribution of wealth
 List of countries by income equality

Distribution of wealth
Global inequality